Walter O'Meara (1897 - 1989) was an American writer born in Minneapolis, Minnesota.

Early life
O'Meara spent his childhood in Cloquet, Minnesota, graduating from Cloquet High School in 1914. O'Meara started his college education at the University of Minnesota before taking a leave of absence to serve in the US Army in World War I. Upon his return, he completed his studies in journalism at the University of Wisconsin–Madison, graduating Phi Beta Kappa in 1920.

Career

O'Meara stayed on in Minnesota for several years, writing for the Duluth News Tribune.  Following his time with the newspaper, he moved to Chicago to work for the advertising agency J. Walter Thompson. In 1932 he relocated to New York to work for the advertising agency Benton & Bowles, but in 1942 rejoined J. Walter Thompson, at their New York office.

O'Meara went on to act as the Chief of Planning for the Office of Strategic Services, as well as the head of the information department of the Office of Price Administration, during World War II. In 1950, following World War II, O'Meara decided to pursue a career in writing. Over the span of his career, he saw a number of magazine articles published, in addition to 16 books. Two of these books, Minnesota Gothic and Grand Portage, were best-sellers.

Personal life
O'Meara was married in 1922 to Esther Arnold, with whom he had four children: Donn, Ellen, Deirdre, and Wolfe. They lived in several places including Washington Mews, NYC; Woodstock, NY; and Danbury, CT. He died in Massachusetts in 1989, at the age of 92.

Bibliography
O'Meara is the author of a number of publications:

Trees Went Forth 1947
Grand Portage 1951
Tales of the Two Borders 1952
Spanish Bride 1954
Minnesota Gothic 1956
Devil's Cross 1957
First Northwest Passage (Illustrated by Lorence Bjorklund) 1960
Savage Country (Illustrated by Philip B. Parsons) 1960
Last Portage (illustrated by William Hofmann) 1962
Guns at the Forks 1965
Duke of War 1966
Daughters of the Country; The Women of the Fur Traders and Mountain Men 1968 
Sioux are Coming (Illustrated by Lorence Bjorklund) 1971
We Made It Through the Winter: A Memoir of Northern Minnesota Boyhood 1974
Guns at the Forks 1979

References

Additional resources
 The   Walter O'Meara Papers are available for research use at the Minnesota Historical Society.

1897 births
1989 deaths
Writers from Minnesota
University of Wisconsin–Madison School of Journalism & Mass Communication alumni
University of Minnesota School of Journalism and Mass Communication alumni